Rajib Lochan Pegu is an Indian politician who was the member of Assam Legislative Assembly from Majuli Assembly constituency (no 99)  in Majuli district. He was Minister of water resources in Tarun Gogoi government.

References

Living people
People from Majuli district
Year of birth missing (living people)
Indian National Congress politicians
Assam MLAs 2016–2021
Assam MLAs 2006–2011
State cabinet ministers of Assam
Indian National Congress politicians from Assam